Johanne Garneau is a Canadian actress.

Garneau was born in Princeville, a village in Québec.

Filmography 
 1976 : Grand-Papa (TV series) : Lise
 1984 : Les Huxtable (TV series) : Rudith "Rudy" Lillian Huxtable (Keshia Knight Pulliam)
 1986 : Des dames de cœur (TV series) : Nicole Belleau
 1989 : Tous les chiens vont au paradis : Anne-Marie
 1989 : The Simpsons (TV series) : Ralph Wiggum, Todd Flanders, Selma Bouvier, Agnes Skinner, Blandine
 1993 : La Princesse astronaute (TV series) : Fée Odale
 2000 : Caillou (TV series) : Leo (voice)
 2001-2002 : Sagwa, the Chinese Siamese Cat (TV series) : ‘’Additional Voices’’ (voice)
 2001 : Belphégor (TV series) : Sarah (voice, 26 episodes)
 2008 : American Dad! (TV series) : Francine Smith (voice)

External links 
 

Living people
Actresses from Quebec
Canadian television actresses
Canadian voice actresses
French Quebecers
Year of birth missing (living people)